Caroline Pilhatsch (born 1 March 1999) is an Austrian swimmer. She competed in the women's 50 metre backstroke event at the 2017 World Aquatics Championships.

References

External links
 

1999 births
Living people
Swimmers at the 2015 European Games
Place of birth missing (living people)
European Games medalists in swimming
European Games gold medalists for Austria
European Games silver medalists for Austria
Austrian female backstroke swimmers
Medalists at the FINA World Swimming Championships (25 m)
20th-century Austrian women
21st-century Austrian women